Roncal may refer to:

Places
Roncal – Erronkari, a town in Navarre in northern Spain
Roncal Valley, an eponymous valley in Navarre

People
Mally Roncal (b. 1972), American makeup artist and founder and president of Mally Beauty
Pedro Roncal (Pedro Roncal Ciriaco, 1962-2018), Spanish journalist

Other
Roncal cheese, a sheep milk cheese from the Valle de Roncal in Spain

See also
 Rhoncal
 Roncalli (disambiguation)
 Rankle
 RANKL